Västernorrland County or Region Västernorrland held regional council elections on 9 September 2018 on the same day as the general and municipal elections.

Results
The number of seats remained at 77 with the Social Democrats winning the most at 28, a drop of ten from in 2014. The party especially lost a lot of ground in Sollefteå following the closure of the childbirth unit of the local hospital, going from 47.6% to 14%.

Municipal results

Percentage

Votes

Images

References

Elections in Västernorrland County
Västernorrland